Stella Nyambura Mwangi (born 1 September 1986) is a Kenyan-Norwegian singer, rapper and songwriter. Much of her music concerns the situation in her home country Kenya, and discrimination her family had to endure after moving to Norway in 1991. Her work has been used in films such as American Pie Presents: The Naked Mile and Save the Last Dance 2, and also in TV-series such as CSI: NY and Scrubs. In Norway, she won the Melodi Grand Prix 2011, and in that same year represented Norway at the Eurovision Song Contest 2011 in Düsseldorf, Germany.

Early and personal life
Stella was born in Murang'a in Central Province of Kenya in 1986 and spent her first 5 years there before her family moved to Eidsvoll in Norway in 1991. She started to practice playing music when she was eight years old. She also plays the piano. Her father made sure she and her siblings learned Gikuyu language and Swahili even far away from home. He used cultural music and poetry to teach them the languages and this inspired Stella's music and her connection to the Kenyan culture.

Mwangi's father was killed in a hit-and-run accident in February 2012.

Eurovision Song Contest 2011
In 2011, Mwangi participated in the Norwegian national selection Melodi Grand Prix 2011 to represent Norway in the Eurovision Song Contest 2011, which was held in Düsseldorf, Germany. On 12 February 2011, Mwangi emerged as the winner.

On 10 May, she represented Norway at the Eurovision Song Contest with the song "Haba Haba" but failed to qualify for the Eurovision final, despite being one of the big favourites of the contest.

Mwangi first topped the official singles chart in Norway in week 6, 2011 with her winning song "Haba Haba".

Melodi Grand Prix 2018
Stella competed in the Melodi Grand Prix  for the chance to represent Norway in the Eurovision Song Contest 2018 along with Alexandra Rotan with the song You Got Me. They placed third overall.

Discography

Albums

Singles

References

External links

Official website
Stella Mwangi aka STL on African Women's Week 2010

1986 births
Living people
Eurovision Song Contest entrants of 2011
Melodi Grand Prix contestants
Eurovision Song Contest entrants for Norway
21st-century Norwegian women singers
21st-century Norwegian singers
Kenyan emigrants to Norway
Norwegian rappers
Norwegian songwriters
Musicians from Eidsvoll